Soprano is the highest female singing voice or the highest voice part in a singing group.

Soprano(s) may also refer to:

People
Soprano (rapper) (b. 1979), stage name of French rapper Saïd M'Roumbaba

Arts, entertainment, and media
The Sopranos (novel), by Scottish writer Alan Warner
The Sopranos, an American crime-drama television series
"The Sopranos" (The Sopranos episode), the 1999 pilot episode of The Sopranos

Musical instruments
Soprano clarinet
Soprano recorder
Soprano saxophone

Other uses
Soprano, a software library in KDE